Loveland Dam (also called Sweetwater Falls Dam) is a dam across the Sweetwater River in San Diego County, California. The dam forms long, narrow Loveland Reservoir which stores  of water. It is operated primarily for flood control and municipal water storage in conjunction with downstream Sweetwater Dam but the reservoir is also open to the public for fishing.

It is built entirely of concrete and has a thin arch design. Loveland is the younger of the two dams on the Sweetwater River; the other, Sweetwater, was built in 1888 while Loveland was only constructed in 1945. It is named after Chester H. Loveland, president of the California Water and Telephone Corporation, the firm that built it. The Loveland Reservoir is considered a better water storage facility than Sweetwater because of its much smaller surface area (454 acres compared to 960) and comparable capacity, thus it is less vulnerable to evaporation.

See also
List of dams and reservoirs in California
List of lakes in California

References

Dams in California
Buildings and structures in San Diego County, California
United States local public utility dams
Dams completed in 1945